Manipayal is a 1973 Indian Tamil-language film, directed by A. Jaganathan and produced and screenplay by R. M. Veerappan. The film dialogue was written by Jagadeesan and the story was written by Poovai Krishan respectively. Music was by M. S. Viswanathan. It stars Master Sekhar and Baby Indra, playing lead, with A. V. M. Rajan, Jayanthi, V. K. Ramasamy and S. V. Subbaiah playing pivotal roles.

Plot 
A cobbler finds himself in prison after being wrongly accused of a crime. He must find a way to prove his innocence in order to lead a dignified life.

Cast 
 A. V. M. Rajan as Arun, Shanthi's ex-lover
 Jayanthi as Shanthi, Selvi's biological mother and her School Teacher
 Master Sekhar as Ilangovan, Kandhan's son and Selvi's adoptive brother
 Baby Indra as Selvi,
 V. K. Ramasamy as Ponnambalam, Police Inspector, Shanthi's adoptive father
 S. A. Ashokan as Parasuram, smuggler
 Thengai Srinivasan as Amavasai, Andal's husband and Kasi's father
 Manorama as Andal, Amavasai's wife and Kasi's mother
 S. V. Subbaiah as Kandhan, a cobbler
 Master Prabhakar as Kasi, Andal and Amavasai's son
 M. S. Sundari Bai as Sivagami, Ponnambalam's wife
 Rajakokila as Rossie, Parasuram's henchman
 Shanmugasundari as Arun's mother
 Isari Velan as Shanthi's house cook
 Ennatha Kannaiya as Constable Alwar Naidu
 Kundumani as Kalimuthu, Ponnambalam's henchman
Usilai Mani in Cameo Appearance
 Haalam as (Dancer)

Production 
A. Jagannathan, who earlier assisted T. Prakash Rao and P. Neelakantan made his directorial debut with this film.

Soundtrack 

Music was by M. S. Viswanathan and lyrics were by Vaali, Avinasimani and Pulamaipithan. Jayachandran made his debut in Tamil as a singer with the song "Thangachimizh Pol" in this film.

References

External links 
 

1970s Tamil-language films
Indian children's films
1973 directorial debut films
1973 films
Films scored by M. S. Viswanathan
Films about siblings
Films about brothers
Films about sisters
Melodrama films
Indian black-and-white films
Films set in 1973
Films directed by A. Jagannathan